Quispe Sisa (ca. 1518 – 1559), also known as Inés Huaylas Yupanqui, was an Inca princess, daughter of the Sapa Inca Huayna Capac. She played a role in the Spanish conquest of Peru. The Palace of the conquest in Trujillo, Spain features busts of her, her daughter Francisca Pizarro Yupanqui, Francisco Pizarro and her daughter's husband, Hernando Pizarro.

Biography
She was the daughter of the Sapa Inca Huayna Capac and one of his secondary wives – the curaca of Huaylas, Contarhuacho. She was baptized as Inés Huaylas Yupanqui when she was married via common law at a young age to conquistador Francisco Pizarro, as conquerors did with the women of the royal families they conquered and subordinated. She cohabited with Pizarro until 1537. In 1534, she gave birth to Francisca Pizarro Yupanqui, and to Gonzalo Pizarro the following year, however Gonzalo died young. Separated from Pizarro in 1538, she lost custody of her Pizarro children and Francisca Pizarro Yupanqui was exiled to Spain in 1551. Quispe Sisa then married Conquistador Francisco de Ampuero. Between 1538 and 1541, she gave birth to three more children – Martín Alonso de Ampuero, Josefa de Ampuero and Francisco de Ampuero.

Siege of Lima
During the siege of Lima, led by Manco Inca Yupanqui, Quispe Sisa sent several runners with messages to her mother in Huaylas asking for help. On September 12, 1536, her mother Contarhuacho sent in an army to help Pizarro defend Lima.

Descendants
Among her direct descendants, at least three governed Latin American nations during the 19th and early 20th centuries, Dominican President José Desiderio Valverde and Bolivian Presidents Pedro José Domingo de Guerra and José Gutiérrez Guerra.

Further reading
Alvaro Vargas Llosa, La Mestiza de Pizarro: una mestiza entre dos mundos (2003) 
Helen Pugh, Intrepid Dudettes of the Inca Empire (2020)

References

External links
 PBS NOVA "The Great Inca Rebellion"

Spanish colonization of the Americas
History of Peru
1559 deaths
Year of birth uncertain
1510s births
Inca royalty
Peruvian women